Alien Garden is a non-game for the Atari 8-bit family published by Epyx in 1982 by Bernie DeKoven and programmed by virtual reality pioneer Jaron Lanier. Designed with an emphasis on the need for experimentation, Alien Garden was described by its creators as an art game, and ranks among the earliest art games. Its release predates Lanier's Moondust by a year.

Gameplay 
Gameplay consists of a side-scrolling world covered in 24 different kinds of crystalline flowers resembling gypsum flowers. The player controls an embryonic animal as it grows, survives and reproduces through 20 generations. Difficulty is introduced through the lack of instructions in the game. As such, the player must employ trial and error techniques to determine which flowers are edible, which flowers shrink or grow when stung, and which flowers are fatal or explosive when touched. The player may use either the organism's tail, stinger, or wings to bump or otherwise make contact with them. To maintain the challenge, the behavior of the flowers changes every time the game is played. To increase the challenge, the score is repeated all along the left and right sides of the scrolling screen. As the score increases, the animal avatar is forced to travel more and more closely to the sometimes deadly crystal flowers.

Reception 
Electronic Fun with Computers & Games praised the game for its "graphically stunning" visuals as well as the experimentation and strategy required. Computer Gaming World, however, harshly criticized the graphics, and felt that the lack of color was "particularly disappointing".

References

External links
Alien Garden at Atari Mania

Manual at the Internet Archive

1982 video games
Atari 8-bit family games
Atari 8-bit family-only games
Art games
Epyx games
Non-games
Video games developed in the United States
Single-player video games